The Ravenswood Manor Historic District is a historic district in the Albany Park community area of North Side, Chicago, Illinois. It is bordered by the Chicago River on the East, and by the alley south of Lawrence Avenue on the North, Sacramento Avenue on the West, and the alley North of Montrose Avenue on the south.

Ravenswood Manor is a primarily residential neighborhood that was developed during the early twentieth century. It contains many bungalows, and some of the homes along the river have their own docks.

One of the most famous recent residents has been former Illinois governor Rod Blagojevich.

The district was added to the National Register of Historic Places on September 5, 2008.

See also
National Register of Historic Places listings in North Side Chicago

References

Historic districts in Chicago
North Side, Chicago
Neighborhoods in Chicago
Houses on the National Register of Historic Places in Chicago
Historic districts on the National Register of Historic Places in Illinois